, better known as , is a Japanese comedian and magician.

Maggy learned from magician, Shiro Maggy. He is the second son of the three brothers.

Filmography

TV series

Miniseries

Advertisements

Websites

Radio series

Films

Music videos

Live

References

External links
Official profile 
 

Japanese comedians
Japanese magicians
1973 births
Living people
People from Miyagi Prefecture